Therese Wagner (1797-1858), was a German businessperson.

She was the owner of the Augustiner-Bräu in 1846–1858.

A street in Münich was named after her in 2020.

References

1797 births
1858 deaths
19th-century German businesswomen
19th-century German businesspeople